"Something Got Me Started" is a song by British soul and pop band Simply Red, released in September 1991 as the first single from their fourth album, Stars (1991). It was released in several forms — a 7-inch single, a 12-inch single, and a CD version, which includes a remix by Perfecto (Paul Oakenfold and Steve Osborne).

The song became successful around the world, peaking at number 11 in the United Kingdom and charting within the top 10 in New Zealand and several European countries; on the Eurochart Hot 100, the single reached number nine in November 1991. It was less successful than the band's previous hits in North America, peaking at number 11 in Canada and number 23 on the US Billboard Hot 100.

"Something Got Me Started" was included on the band's compilation albums, Greatest Hits in 1996, Simply Red 25: The Greatest Hits in 2008 and Song Book 1985–2010 in 2013.

Development and composition
Simply Red had achieved considerable commercial and critical success from the mid-1980s onwards with their own blue-eyed soul style that saw them repeatedly reach the top 10 around the world. Despite the 1989 album A New Flame selling over two million copies in the UK alone, frontman Mick Hucknall was keen to develop the sound of the band further. The same year A New Flame was released, a number of dance-orientated records had started to infiltrate the UK singles chart, most notably the songs from the group Soul II Soul. In 2005, when interviewed for the Classic Albums episode on the making of the Stars album, Hucknall commented that he wanted a programmed drum sound that didn't sound synthetic. This led him to working with new musicians, including musician Gota Yashiki whose expertise with drum programming effectively replaced founder drummer Chris Joyce. Producer Stewart Levine also introduced Hucknall to Heitor Pereira which changed the guitar sound on the record, putting more emphasis on rhythm than melody. An early version of the song "Something Got Me Started" was premiered in a March 1990 concert in Didsbury, Manchester, whilst the group were promoting A New Flame (later released on the VHS/Laserdisc Let Me Take You Home).

Release
Released on 9 September 1991, nearly a month before the album itself, "Something Got Me Started" reached number 11 on the UK Singles Chart, and a number of remixes by artists like Steve 'Silk' Hurley and Paul Oakenfold helped it to achieve success on both the UK and European dance charts. "Something Got Me Started" was later re-recorded for the 2005 album Simplified, and re-released as a single in January 2006. The song has remained in Simply Red's live set lists since it was first premiered in 1990 and is often played as a final encore.

Critical reception
AllMusic editor Jon O'Brien opined that the "funky piano-led" song and "Stars" justify the Stars album's multi-platinum success. Larry Flick from Billboard felt the track "maintains the Brit-eyed soul of previous hits", noting that Mick Hucknall "turns in an unusually restrained vocal, which adds depth and maturity to an already potent track." Swedish Expressen described it as "bouncy". Dave Sholin from the Gavin Report commented, "Red hot from the moment they reached America's shores, the Mick Hucknall-led Simply Red outfit forged an intensely loyal following." He added that reminiscent of their 1986 hit, "Money's (Too Tight Too Mention)", "this uptempo groove is too strong to ignore." Adam Sweeting from The Guardian remarked that "without batting an eyelid, they swiftly get a bit of heat going under" "Something Got Me Started". Pan-European magazine Music & Media complimented the song as "state of the art Simply Red. Mick Hucknall's star is still shining bright on this "Money's Too Tight Too Mention" type of song." A reviewer from People Magazine noted its "peppy lite funk". Al Walentis from Reading Eagle called it "brassy". Richard Paton from Toledo Blade viewed it as a "soulful groove". Johnny Dee from Smash Hits complimented it as "superb".

Retrospective response
Ellen Fagan for CultureSonar ranked "Something Got Me Started" number one in their list of "Simply Red's Top 10 Songs" in 2018. She wrote that here, Simply Red "charges out of the proverbial gate with great impact. The dizzyingly beautiful video entices the eye with lithe, dancing silhouettes, a European backdrop, and delicious '80s overdrive. Another "love gone wrong" song with some lyrics but counters that with an upbeat tempo, powerful harmonies and a "call and answer" format of "I'd give it all up for you/(yes I would)" that builds in an irresistible crescendo." In an 2015 retrospective review, Pop Rescue stated that the vocal melody here, sat alongside the funky bass and piano, "really gives this a light, upbeat feeling."

Music video
The official music video for the song was directed by British film and music video director Andy Morahan who later directed videos for the Simply Red songs "Fake" and "Home" in Sicily. It was partly shot in Seville, Spain. The video features Hucknall dancing indoors and in the street, silhouettes of the band playing and a central female character who is seen in a number of city locations and riding on the back of a scooter.

Simplified version
"Something Got Me Started" was one of the eight previously released Simply Red songs re-recorded for the 2005 album Simplified. It also became the second single release from the album, as a double A-side with a new cover of the Leon Russell song "A Song for You".

Track listings

 7-inch, cassette, and mini-CD single
 "Something Got Me Started"
 "A New Flame"

 UK 12-inch single
A1. "Something Got Me Started" (Perfecto mix)
B1. "Something Got Me Started" (instrumental)
B2. "A New Flame"

 US 12-inch single
A1. "Something Got Me Started" (Hurley's house remix) – 5:56
A2. "Something Got Me Started" (Hurley's dub) – 5:44
B1. "Something Got Me Started" (E-Smoove's Late Night mix) – 5:00
B2. "Something Got Me Started" (Smoove dub mix) – 5:44

 UK CD single
 "Something Got Me Started"
 "Come on in My Kitchen"
 "A New Flame"
 "Something Got Me Started" (Perfecto mix)

 US CD single
 "Something Got Me Started" – 4:00
 "Come on in My Kitchen" – 1:30
 "If You Don't Know Me by Now" – 3:24
 "Something Got Me Started" (Perfecto mix) – 5:13

Credits and personnel
Credits are lifted from the Stars album booklet.

Studios
 Recorded at Condulmer Recording Studio (Venice, Italy)
 Mixed at Conway Studios (Los Angeles)
 Mastered at Bernie Grundman Mastering (Los Angeles)

Simply Red
 Mick Hucknall – words, music, vocals, backing vocals, co-production
 Fritz McIntyre – music, additional vocals, keyboards
 Tim Kellett – keyboards
 Heitor Pereira – guitars
 Ian Kirkham – saxophone
 Gota Yashiki – drums, percussion, programs
 Shaun Ward – bass guitar

Other personnel
 Stewart Levine – production
 Daren Klein – mixing, engineering
 Sandro Franchin – assistant engineering
 Marnie Riley – assistant mix engineering
 Bernie Grundman – mastering

Charts

Weekly charts

Year-end charts

References

1991 singles
1991 songs
East West Records singles
Music videos directed by Andy Morahan
Music videos shot in Spain
Simply Red songs
Song recordings produced by Stewart Levine
Songs written by Fritz McIntyre
Songs written by Mick Hucknall